The Neoplan Jumbocruiser was an articulated double-deck multi-axle city coach built by Neoplan Bus GmbH between 1975 and 1992.

History

The Jumbocruiser was first manufactured in 1975 but never went into full-scale production.

This vehicle was involved in a rollover accident, initially claimed caused by a design fault but the parties concerned agreed that it was due to driver error while handling a cup of coffee.

It was then rebuilt by Jumbocruiser Ltd (no connection) of Bristol in England. They used the services of Richard Cœur de Lyon (now called the Caross Center) near Mons in Belgium to completely strip the coach and rebuild it to a more modern design, and with modified suspension.  A modern digital turntable was prepared and fitted by HÜBNER in Germany.  The internal combustion engine, gearbox, braking system, wiring looms, and the dashboard were replaced and upgraded.  A new dashboard with semi-digital wrap-around unit was installed in place of the original rust-prone flat unit. Modern front and end caps were fitted, and were eventually reduced after they were found to be too wide. The vehicle was tested by Vehicle and Operator Services Agency in the UK in November 2006 and by 2007 Jumbocruiser Ltd. began to market the bus as a "rock 'n' roll" star sleeper bus. but had sold it by February 2010.

See also 

 List of buses
 AutoTram Extra Grand

References

External links

Articulated buses
Double-decker buses
Jumbocruiser
Vehicles introduced in 1975
Coaches (bus)